Chuice is a bottled food product manufactured by Taste of Earth, LLC. It has been bottled by Atlantic Station since 2013. This product was developed by fitness trainer Ladell Hill and is described as a "chewable juice". It is composed of 35 different ingredients including fruits, vegetables, nuts, herbs, and seeds. The product is sold in the Atlanta, Georgia area in the United States.

The juice is unpasteurized and is available in two flavors: Forest (Mad Greens) and River of Life (Fresh Beets).

Origins 
Chuice was created by Ladell Hill, who claims to go days without consuming anything other than the product.

Flavors and Components 
Chuice is a fruit and vegetable juice with floating pieces of fruits, vegetables, herbs, nuts, and seeds. They are sweetened with honey and have 26 grams of sugar, 9 grams of fiber, and 42 grams of carbs per 12-oz drink.

Forest 
The beverage is made up of pureed fruits and vegetables: apple, cucumber, carrot, pineapple, kale, orange, honey, and spinach. It also features intact chunks of mint, pecans, sunflower seeds, ginger, cilantro, basil, almonds, pumpkin seeds, walnuts, flaxseed, hemp, sesame seeds, and chia seeds, as well as being seasoned by cinnamon and cayenne.

River of Life 
The River of Life flavor differs from the Forest flavor only in that beet juice is added.

References

External links
 
 Video from Atlanta's 11 Alive News

Juice brands
Raw foodism